Beverly Shores is a train station in Beverly Shores, Indiana, served by the South Shore Line interurban commuter railroad. The station serves the town of Beverly Shores as well as the nearby Town of Pines. It is a flag stop.

Architecture

This is one of eleven such stations built along Insull lines, which included the Chicago North Shore and Milwaukee line. Of the eleven, only this station and the North Shore Line's Briergate station still exist.  The Mediterranean Revival style was used for a series of buildings adjacent to the station, including the Bartlett Real Estate Office.

Beverly Shores station is one of the last two examples of the "Insull Spanish" architecture style used for station houses along the electric railroad lines acquired by Samuel Insull in the first part of the twentieth century. The other is in Highland Park, IL, with the Briergate station but it is threatened with demolition.  It was a Mediterranean Revival style designed by Insull's staff-architect, Arthur U. Gerber. The station is served by daily passenger trains of the South Shore Line. Although freight trains pass daily in either direction, no freight service is offered from this location. The station housed an agent, Nellie Warren, and her husband at one time. This section is now an art gallery. The most notable characteristic of the station, aside from the Spanish style, is the large neon sign reading "Beverly Shores".

The station house is located north of the track. There is a rudimentary paved platform structure directly in front of it. A small parking lot is located right behind the depot.

History

The South Shore Line began in 1901 as the Chicago and Indiana Air Line Railway.  It was incorporated in 1925, when several stations were added, including the Beverly Shores Station at Broadway and another at Central Avenue. The station was designed by architect Arthur Gerber and built by Leo W. Post in 1929 as a mirror image of the Lake Shore station built two years earlier and demolished in the 1970s.

The Beverly Shores station replaced an earlier structure serving the developing resort community of Beverly Shores on Lake Michigan. This is the last unaltered Insull Spanish style structure of the nine built on Samuel Insull's South and North Shore Lines. It still serves the 88-mile long South Shore Line, the last of the electric interurban railway systems. This station typifies Insull's interurban routes; it is the best representative of the South Shore Line's history.

Before 1946, a large neon sign was added to the roof. The sign is owned by the town of Beverly Shores and leased to the railroad until November 2034. The land is owned by the Northern Indiana Public Service Company (NIPSCO), who leases it to the railroad on a 99-year lease that began in August 1929. The building is owned by the South Shore Railroad.

On July 19, 1989, the Beverly Shores station was added to the National Register of Historic Places.

Upcoming Improvements

As part of a larger project to double-track the South Shore Line from Gary to Michigan City, Beverly Shores will receive a second track and a second platform. While some other stations are receiving major renovations as part of the project, Beverly Shores will only see a new low-level platform to accommodate the second track, while the parking and station building will remain unchanged. This renovation is projected to be completed in mid-2024. As of September 2022, the second track has been constructed at the station and one of the two new platforms has been completed.

References

External links
 
 Beverly Shores Historical Society – Depot Art Gallery & Museum – official site
 South Shore Line – Stations

National Register of Historic Places in Porter County, Indiana
National Register of Historic Places in Indiana Dunes National Park
South Shore Line stations in Indiana
Railway stations in the United States opened in 1929
Railway stations on the National Register of Historic Places in Indiana
Mediterranean Revival architecture in the United States
Railway stations in Porter County, Indiana
Museums in Porter County, Indiana
Art museums and galleries in Indiana
History museums in Indiana
1929 establishments in Indiana